Vig-Mnelë is a former municipality in the Shkodër County, northwestern Albania. At the 2015 local government reform it became a subdivision of the municipality Vau i Dejës. The population at the 2011 census was 1,509.

References

Former municipalities in Shkodër County
Administrative units of Vau i Dejës